Allons may refer to:

 Allons, Alpes-de-Haute-Provence, a commune of the Alpes-de-Haute-Provence département in France
 Allons, Lot-et-Garonne, a commune of the Lot-et-Garonne département in France
 Allons, Tennessee, US

See also
 Allonne (disambiguation)
 Allonnes (disambiguation)